Mimi Keene (born Mimi Saeed, 5 August 1998) is an English actress. She is best known for her roles as Ruby Matthews on the Netflix comedy-drama series Sex Education (2019–present) and Cindy Williams on the BBC One soap opera EastEnders (2013–2015)

Early life
Keene was born Mimi Saeed on 5 August 1998 in London. She lived in South Woodford  and attended Churchfields Junior School. She then moved to Hertfordshire and attended Divine Saviour Roman Catholic School in Abbots Langley. Later she moved to Barnsbury, Islington, to train full-time at the Italia Conti Academy of Theatre Arts from 2009 to 2014.

Career
Keene began her career as a child actress on stage, making her professional debut playing Janey in Kin at The Royal Court Theatre from 19 November to 23 December 2010. In 2013, she appeared in CBBC's Sadie J as Brandy May Lou and in Our Girl as Jade Dawes. Between 2013 and 2015, she was a series regular in EastEnders, playing Cindy Williams. For her role, she earned British and Inside Soap Award nominations. She voiced Eurayle, Stheno, and Medusa in the 2013 video game Castlevania: Lords of Shadow - Mirror of Fate and its 2014 sequel Castlevania: Lords of Shadow 2. In 2016, she appeared in an episode of Casualty as Lana Westmore, and played Megan in a short film, The Escape, in 2017. In 2019, she portrayed the younger version of Edith Tolkien in Tolkien, began playing Ruby Matthews in the Netflix series Sex Education, and appeared in the film Close. Mimi has finished filming the 4th series of ‘Sex Education’ and can next be seen starring as Nathalie in the latest instalment of the ‘After’ series, alongside Hero Fiennes Tiffin. The film is currently in post production.

Filmography

Film

Television

Video games

Awards and nominations

References

External links

 

1998 births
21st-century English actresses
Actresses from Hertfordshire
Alumni of the Italia Conti Academy of Theatre Arts
English child actresses
English soap opera actresses
English television actresses
Living people
People from Hertfordshire